Richard Sadlier (born 14 January 1979, in Dublin) is an Irish former professional footballer and former CEO of St Patrick's Athletic. Since retirement from the professional game he has worked as a pundit with RTÉ Sport.

Club career
He began his career at youth level with Leicester Celtic and Belvedere before joining Millwall F.C. He was educated at St. Benildus College where he excelled on the sports fields.

Richard helped Millwall towards becoming 2000–01 Second Division Champions but was forced to watch from the stand as Millwall reached the 2004 FA Cup Final in his final season. A striker, Sadlier scored 34 goals in 103 starts for Millwall. In an interview with the BBC, Mark McGhee named Sadlier as potentially the best young centre forward he had ever worked with in his managerial career. In 2003, Sadlier retired from the professional game due to a hip injury at the age of 24.

International career

Sadlier represented his country at the 1997 UEFA European Under-18 Championship, and scored Ireland's goal against Spain in the third-place playoff.

Sadlier's only cap at senior level came against Russia in a friendly at Lansdowne Road on 13 February 2002. He was highly favoured to make Mick McCarthy's final 23-man Republic of Ireland squad for the 2002 FIFA World Cup, but had to withdraw with a hip injury which ultimately ended his football career prematurely.

Board appointment
In 2007, Sadlier was appointed to the board of St Patrick's Athletic F.C. He resigned from his post at St Patrick's at the end of the 2009 season.

Media career
In 2006, Sadlier was approached to write a column for the Sunday Independent after previously doing some punditry work with Setanta Sports, he also contributes regularly to Newstalk.

In 2008, Sadlier joined RTÉ's panel of pundits for its League of Ireland coverage, dominated by Monday Night Soccer. He later contributed to RTÉ Sport's coverage of the 2010 FIFA World Cup. He became a panellist on RTÉ Two's Premier Soccer Saturday, and covered the 2010–11 Premier League. In 2012, Sadlier was a studio analyst as part of RTÉ Sport's coverage of UEFA Euro 2012, and also appeared on Craig Doyle Live on 11 June 2012. In June 2013, he was part of RTÉ Sport's coverage of the 2013 FIFA Confederations Cup alongside Ronnie Whelan and Kenny Cunningham.
He was also part of RTÉ Sport's studio coverage of the 2014 FIFA World Cup, the UEFA Euro 2016, the 2018 FIFA World Cup, and the UEFA Euro 2020.

Personal life
Sadlier is married with one son. Sadlier has spoken publicly of suffering from depression, particularly following the death of fellow professional Gary Speed. Sadlier holds a BSc in Sports Science from the University of Surrey and a Higher Diploma and MA in Psychotherapy from Dublin Business School. 
His autobiography called Recovering was released in 2019 and won the 2019 Irish Sports Book of the Year award.

Honours
Millwall

Football League Trophy Runner Up-1998-99
Football League Second Division (1): 2000–01

References

1979 births
Living people
Association football forwards
Millwall F.C. players
Republic of Ireland association footballers
Republic of Ireland international footballers
Republic of Ireland youth international footballers
Expatriate footballers in England
Irish expatriate sportspeople in England
Association footballers from County Dublin
Sunday Independent (Ireland) people
English Football League players
Leicester Celtic A.F.C. players
Belvedere F.C. players
Alumni of Dublin Business School
Alumni of the University of Surrey